Watch Out For Snakes is the pseudonym of Atlanta-based musician and producer Matt Baum. He is often credited as a pioneer of the chipwave genre, fusing elements of chiptune and synthwave.

He is also known for placing emphasis on his live performances, which employ a keytar and have been characterized as high-energy and aggressive. He has participated in a number of synthwave, chiptune, and video game music festivals including Echosynthetic Fest, Neon Rose Fest, and MAGFest.

Style
Baum synthesizes his chiptune instrumentation from the Nintendo and Game Boy video game systems. His albums have been described as imaginary video game soundtracks and he has stated that they draw thematically from personal events in his own life.

Discography

Albums
 UPGRADE (2018)
 Scars (2019)

Singles
 Rip ‘Em Up! (2019)
 Scars (2019)
 Fight Those Invisible Ninjas (2021)

Compilations
 "Set Up Us the Bomb” on Neo-Wave Vol. 1 (2018)
 “Arms Race” on Chiptunes = WIN: Volume 7 (2018)
 “This Ain’t No Cutscene” on Lunar Halo (2019)
 “Stranded” on Spacetunes = WIN (2019)

Remixes
 Frisky Monkey - “Now! (Watch Out For Snakes Remix)” (2019)
 The Warhorse - “Can’t Stop the Clop (Watch Out For Snakes Remix)” (2019)

Other
 MacReady - “Sunset on Mt. Fuji (ft. Watch Out For Snakes)” on Kiba (2019)

See also
Geek rock
Mystery Science Theater 3000
Nerd music

External links
 
 WOFS on Bandcamp

References

Chiptune musicians
Synthwave musicians
American electronic musicians
Keytarists
Musicians from Atlanta
Tracker musicians
Living people
1981 births